Muuga is a village in Viimsi Parish, Harju County in northern Estonia. Half of the village's territory is occupied by the Port of Muuga (which also occupies lands from Uusküla and Maardu). As of 2011 Census, the settlement's population was 581, of which the Estonians were 327 (56.3%).

Western part of Muuga is connected to the centre of Tallinn by Tallinn Bus Company's route nr. 38 (Viru keskus – Muuga), average traveling time is about 35 minutes. The eastern part is reachable by route nr. 34A (Viru keskus - Muuga aedlinn), average traveling time is also about 35 minutes but it is much more frequent.

Estonia's second largest glacial erratic Kabelikivi ("Chapel Rock") is located in Muuga. It is 18.7 m long, 14.9 m wide and 6.4 m high, above ground volume is 728 m³.

References

External links
Port of Muuga

Villages in Harju County